John Denver's Greatest Hits is the first greatest hits album by American singer-songwriter John Denver, released in November 1973 by RCA Records. A version known as The Best of John Denver with the same track listing was released in some countries.

History
The collection included material from his earlier days as a songwriter (going back to 1965 on "For Bobbie") to his later hit "Rocky Mountain High".  Indeed, many of these tracks were not hits per se, but as Stephen Thomas Erlewine wrote for Allmusic, "the[se] were [the] songs that defined him."

Moreover, Greatest Hits is important historically because it contained new and reimagined recordings of several songs. Notable new versions included "Leaving on a Jet Plane", "Starwood in Aspen", "Follow Me", "Rhymes and Reasons", "The Eagle and the Hawk", "Sunshine On My Shoulders" and "Poems, Prayers, and Promises".

Denver explained this himself in the liner notes by saying that he had picked the numbers most requested in his concerts, but that "I felt that some of these songs had grown a bit, that I am singing better than I was four or five years ago, and that I would like to treat some of the songs a little differently than I had in the original recordings."

After its release these versions were used for airplay despite differing in subtle but important ways from the original versions; generally, they were more polished, featured a more mature-sounding Denver, included strings, and were extended somewhat.

Within a few months of its release, Greatest Hits climbed to the top of the Billboard 200 pop albums chart, went platinum, and was one of the first albums worldwide to sell over 10 million copies.  Overall it is easily the best-selling album of his career in the United States, being certified 9-times Platinum by the RIAA. The album was on the Canadian RPM Top 100 charts for 110 weeks between December 15, 1973, and May 8, 1976.

Track listing
All tracks produced by Milton Okun; all tracks written by John Denver except where noted.

Charts

Weekly charts

Year-end charts

Certifications

Personnel
For the newly recorded tracks:
 John Denver – vocals, acoustic guitar
 Eric Weissberg – guitars, banjo
 Dick Kniss – bass
 Frank Owens – piano
 Herb Lovelle – drums
 Gary Chester – percussion

See also
 List of best-selling albums in the United States

References

1973 greatest hits albums
John Denver compilation albums
Albums produced by Milt Okun
RCA Records compilation albums